Uzunlar is a Turkish surname. Notable people with the surname include:

Musa Uzunlar (born 1959), Turkish actor
Servet Uzunlar (born 1989), Australian soccer player

See also
Uzunlar, Hani
Odzun

Turkish-language surnames